Banzhuang is a town in Ganyu District, Lianyungang, in the north of Jiangsu province of China, adjacent to Linyi of Shandong Province.

History
Archeological artifacts found in the west of the town provide evidence that the area was part of the ancient Zhuqi Kingdom for thousands of years before Zhuqi became a vassal state of the Zhou dynasty. During the earlier Spring and Autumn period, Lu expanded to the west of Zhuqi up to the Banzhuang area.

From the Qin to the Sui dynasty periods, Banzhuang was part of Zhuqi. The Zhuqi County seat was situated to the east of Gucheng, a big village to the west of Banzhuang. Following the Tang dynasty overthrow of the Sui dynasty, Zhuqi County was combined into Huairen County in the year 623. Banzhuang has continued to exist administratively as part of the western part of Ganyu (i.e. Huairen) County to the present day.

At the end of the Qing dynasty, reforms were made to the local government system granting greater local autonomy. As part of these reforms, Jiagu City was founded near Guangxiao Town in Ganyu County. Jiagu City was an amalgamation of four towns: Menlouhe Town, Xingning Town, Banlizhuang Town, and Huandun Town. The city government was based in Huandun Town.

After the national government in Nanjing overthrew the Beiyang authorities in Peking, it began to make further reforms to the local and central administrative system. Ganyu became a county of the 8th Administrative District (also called Donghai Administrative District) of Jiangsu Province. Jiagu City became the 4th district of Ganyu County.

When the Japanese invaded and occupied Ganyu County, the local government was dismissed, and a new, pro-Japanese government was established. When the Communist Party of China (CPC) retook the area from Japanese forces, they set up a new administrative system. The fourth district of Ganyu County was divided further into smaller districts: Zhumeng District in the south and Guyang District in the north. In 1951, Guyang District was the 7th District of Ganyu County, covering 11 towns; Zhumeng District was the 9th District of Ganyu County, covering 9 towns.

During the third civil war between the CPC and Kuomintang, the CPC controlled all of Ganyu County. Zhumeng District broke away from Ganyu County for several months in 1947.

After the CPC occupied Nanjing, the capital of China at the time, Jiangsu Province was abolished and split up. Ganyu County was combined into Shandong Province up until Jiangsu Province was restored in 1953. In this same year, the 9th District of Ganyu County was abolished and combined into the 7th District of the county.

In 1955, the 7th District of Ganyu County was called Jiagushan District. In May 1958, Jiagushan District was divided into two towns: Jiagushan Town and Huandun Town. When the Campaign of People's Commune began, the two towns' names were changed to Jiagushan People's Commune and Huandun People's Commune, respectively.

In 1958, construction of Shilianghe Reservoir began, triggering migrations out of the Banzhuang area. However, these migrations were poorly organized; many arrived at their new homes and found nothing prepared. The government did not reimburse migrants for losses related to their displacement until 50 years later. Some migrants eventually returned to their homes in the area. 

In 1961, Jiagushan People's Commune was divided into Banzhuang People's Commune and Jiashan People's Commune.

In 1983, the People's Commune was abolished in Jiangsu Province. Huandun People's Commune was restored to its old name of Huandun Township; Banzhuang People's Commune was renamed Banzhuang Township, and Jiashan People's Commune became Jiashan Township. In 1985, Huandun Township became Huandun Town, while Banzhuang Township became a town in 2000.

In 2001, Banzhuang Town and Jiashan Township were united into Banzhuang Town.

On January 31, 2013, Jiangsu's provincial government decreed the merger of Huandun Township into Banzhuang Town.

Geography

Banzhuang is the largest town in Ganyu County, covering an area of 175.61 square kilometers.

The north part of the town is characterized by low hills. Many of the low mountains have local names: Taipin, Langtou, Zhuqi, Jiagu, Hulu, Jinniu, Shuang, Ma (Horse), Liao, Ma'an (Anti-Japan), Liujia, Gejia, Heng, Zhuque. The south part of the town features fertile plains and constitutes the main farming area of Banzhuang Town.

Rice, wheat, corn, peanut, and soy are the staple crops grown in the area. In the northern hilly areas, fruit and tea trees are very common. Other common crops include mung and adzuki.

There are some small rivers which run through the town. Starting in 1949, some small canals were dug for the purpose of irrigation and for connecting Shilianghe Reservoir and Tashan Reservoir. There are no large natural lakes, only man-made reservoirs, such as Shilianghe Reservoir, Honglingjin Reservoir, and Sanba Reservoir.

Shilianghe Reservoir is the largest man-made lake in the town, and in Jiangsu Province. It was dug in 1958 and finished in 1960s. The reservoir is fed by the New Shoo, Zhufan, and Tangz Rivers. A 1st-grade flood trench links Shilianghe Reservoir and Tashan Reservoir.

Government and Politics

Administrative divisions
Banzhuang is divided into 44 administrative villages. There are also natural villages, which do not act as administrative divisions.

The town's administrative villages are listed as follows:

Politics

As in the rest of China, the Communist Party is the sole party in power in the area. All officials of the government are in theory elected by local residents according to the local laws. In practice, the county governor nominates and installs government officials. Despite laws stating otherwise, local residents have no right to recall these officials.

The Secretary of the Communist Party is the supreme leader of the town, but does not exercise administrative authority. The head de jure of town government is the governor of the town.

References

Township-level divisions of Jiangsu
Lianyungang